The Chico Hamilton Quintet with Strings Attached is an album by drummer and bandleader Chico Hamilton's Quintet, recorded in 1958 and released on the Warner Bros. label. The album features some of the earliest released recordings of Eric Dolphy.

Reception

Billboard called it "an outstanding jazz set featuring fine performances and exciting ideas." The AllMusic review by Scott Yanow states: "The West Coast jazz chamber music generally holds one's interest."

Track listing
 "Something to Live For" (Billy Strayhorn, Duke Ellington) - 3:56	
 "Andante" (Luther Henderson) - 2:30	
 "Speak Low" (Kurt Weill, Ogden Nash) - 2:28
 "Pottsville, U.S.A." (Bill Potts) - 5:43
 "Don's Delight" (Chico Hamilton, Howard McGhee) - 3:49
 "Strange" (Fred Fisher, John La Touche) - 3:09
 "Modes" (Fred Katz) - 6:38
 "Fair Weather" (Benny Golson) - 3:00
 "Close Your Eyes" (Bernice Petkere) - 4:38
 "Ev'rything I've Got" (Richard Rodgers, Lorenz Hart) - 2:02

Personnel
Chico Hamilton - drums, percussion
Eric Dolphy - alto saxophone, bass clarinet, flute 
Nathan Gershman - cello
Dennis Budimir - guitar
Wyatt Ruther - bass
unidentified string section arranged and conducted by Fred Katz

References 

1959 albums
Chico Hamilton albums
Warner Records albums